The Mansion of Miša Anastasijević is one of the most notable buildings in Belgrade, Serbia. It is the University of Belgrade's administration and governance building.

History
The building was designed by Czech architect Jan Nevole and built in 1863. It had been originally designed to serve for the anticipated court of the grandson of Karađorđe Petrović, who was married to Captain Miša’s youngest daughter Sara. Nevertheless, following the realization of construction, Captain Miša Anastasijevic gave his mansion as a gift to “his mother country for educational purposes”. In September 1863, the Belgrade Higher School was moved into the building. This site is often regarded as one of the most beautiful buildings in Belgrade. Today, the seat of the University of Belgrade is headquartered within its premises. 

Captain Miša's Mansion was declared Monument of Culture of Exceptional Importance in 1979, and it is protected by Republic of Serbia.

Gallery

See also
 Tourism in Serbia
 University of Belgrade
 Belgrade Law School
 Monument of Culture of Exceptional Importance

References

External links

Buildings and structures in Belgrade
Education in Belgrade
Cultural Monuments of Exceptional Importance (Serbia)
Architecture in Serbia
1860s establishments in Europe
University of Belgrade
University and college administration buildings
19th-century establishments in Serbia